The Manchester College is the largest further education college in the United Kingdom and the largest single provider of 16-19, adult and higher education in Greater Manchester, with more than 25% of Greater Manchester’s learning provision undertaken by the College.

It is currently rated "Good" across all areas by Ofsted and ranked the number one provider of 16-19 and adult education in Greater Manchester.

History

The origins of the college go back to the early 19th century St. John's Sunday school, a pioneering school for workers. By the 1950s this had evolved into St John's and Openshaw Technical College.

Later mergers created the Central College Manchester which became The Manchester College of Arts and Technology in Manchester, while institutions in Central Manchester, Fielden Park, Arden and Wythenshawe merged to form City College Manchester.

In 2008 these two combined to form The Manchester College.

In 2018 The Manchester College split its higher education provision, creating UCEN Manchester an alternative higher education provider. UCEN Manchester delivers its performing arts courses under The Arden brand and also incorporates the Manchester Film School.

The College is part of the LTE Group, the UK’s largest social enterprise specialising in education, alongside UCEN Manchester, apprenticeship provider Total People, prison education provider Novus and professional development provider MOL.

Courses
The Manchester College provides a range of Level 1-4 courses for 16-19-year-olds and via ten Industry Excellence Academies and 19 Centres of Excellence.  Courses are co-created and co-delivered with a range of industry partners, with around 4,500 work experience opportunities provided for students per year.

In September 2021, The Manchester College was one of the colleges chosen to offer new T Levels in Construction; Digital; Education & Childcare; and Health & Healthcare Science.  From September 2022 the College will also be offering T Levels in a further five areas including Finance, Engineering and Manufacturing.

The Manchester College’s Centre of Excellence for Adult Education offers adult and professional courses in 20 subject areas, from Entry Level to Level 6.

Campuses
The Manchester College currently has ten campuses across the city, comprising classrooms, lecture theatres and a wide range of practical workshops, performance and rehearsal rooms, along with tutorial and specialist learning spaces.

Locations 

 Shena Simon
 Nicholls
 St John’s
 Centre of Excellence for Medical Sciences
 Openshaw
 Harpurhey
 Wythenshawe
 Fielden
 Northenden (Closed 2022)

In September 2016, LTE Group agreed to consolidate its estate for The Manchester College and UCEN Manchester to five estates.

Phase One of the Estates Strategy saw a £139m investment into Manchester’s education provision, funded by LTE Group, Greater Manchester Combined Authority, Local Enterprise Partnership and Manchester City Council.

This included the construction of a new £93m campus in Manchester city centre, next to the Manchester Arena and Manchester Victoria station.

The campus will open its doors to the first students in September 2022, providing Industry Excellence Academies and Centres of Excellence for Computing and Digital; Creative and Digital Media; Hospitality and Catering; Music; and Theatrical and Media Make-up and; Performing Arts and Design, music and Virtual Arts.

Phase One also included the £25m redevelopment of the College’s Openshaw campus. Opening in September 2021, the renovated campus includes College’s Industry Excellence Academies and Centres of Excellence for Construction and Engineering; Health and Social Care; Childhood Studies and Sport.

Northern campus based in Wythenshawe was closed September 2022 to make way for new housing.

MOL
The MOL division delivers professional development training programmes by flexible learning. MOL has existed for more than 30 years providing HR, management, estate agency, construction and electrical engineering courses.

Many courses are delivered in partnership with professional bodies such as the Chartered Institute of Personnel and Development (CIPD), the Association of Accounting Technicians (AAT) and the National Federation of Property Professionals (NFOPP).

Offender learning
The Manchester College delivers learning and skills services to offenders in 42 secure establishments throughout England and in two probation areas. The services are contracted in both the private and public sectors to all categories of offender.

Notable alumni

 Johnny Marr (In October 1980, Marr enrolled at Wythenshawe College, serving as President of the school's Student Union.)
 Brooke Vincent
 Saoirse Monica-Jackson
 Matt Greenwood
 Theo Graham
 Carlos Mendes Gomes

References

External links
 

Further education colleges in Manchester
Further education colleges in Greater Manchester
Further education colleges in the Collab Group
Educational institutions established in 2008
2008 establishments in England
Didsbury